Zolotievca  is a commune in the Anenii Noi District of Moldova. It is composed of three villages: Larga, Nicolaevca and Zolotievca.

References

Communes of Anenii Noi District